Massapequa High School is a public high school located in Massapequa, New York, United States, for students in grades 10 through 12.

As of the 2021–22 school year, the school had an enrollment of 1,496 students and 150.7 classroom teachers (on an FTE basis), for a student–teacher ratio of 9.9:1. There were 98 students (6.6% of enrollment) eligible for free lunch and 20 (1.3% of students) eligible for reduced-cost lunch.

History
Massapequa High School's first graduating class, the class of 1956, remained at the elementary school located at Hicksville Road for its freshman year and then spent the next two years at what was to become East Lake Junior High School (now known as East Lake Elementary School). Massapequa High School opened in its own location on Merrick Road in September 1955.

Berner High School opened in 1962 to relieve the growing population of Massapequa High School. After a decline in district enrollment, Berner High School closed in 1987 and now serves 6th-8th grade students as Berner Middle School.

Massapequa High School underwent an expansion in the northeast corner of the school, with construction of a new wing with eight classrooms completed in September 2007.  The school's football and baseball fields, as well as the track, were redone during the spring and summer of 2017, which meant a call for relocation of the tennis courts towards the south entrance.

Notable alumni
 Ted Alflen (born 1946), former pro football player
 Brian Baldinger (born 1959), former pro football player
 Gary Baldinger (born 1963), former pro football player
 Rich Baldinger (born 1959), former pro football player
 Phil Baroni (born 1976), wrestler; professional Mixed Martial Artist, formerly with the UFC
 Matt Bennett (born 1991, class of 2008), actor/singer
 Joey Buttafuoco (born 1956, class of 1974), auto body shop owner best known for having had an affair with a 17-year-old girl who later shot his wife
 Mary Jo Buttafuoco (born 1955, class of 1974), motivational speaker, and ex-wife of Joey Buttafuoco
 Candy Darling (1944-1974), transgender Andy Warhol superstar
 Albert DeMeo, son of Gambino mobster Roy Demeo.
 Kathy Fleming (born 1967, class of 1985),former pro runner
 Jessica Hahn (born 1959, class of 1977), Playboy model, actor, focus of Jim Bakker scandal
 Anthony Ingrassia (1944–1995), playwright, producer and director
 Brian Kilmeade (born 1964, class of 1982), television host and author
 Jerry Seinfeld (born 1954, class of 1972), comedian.
 Brian Setzer (born 1959, class of 1977), musician
 Casey Stern (born 1978, class of 1996) SiriusXM radio personality
 Christie Welsh, (born 1981), former professional soccer player.

References

External links
 

Educational institutions established in 1955
Public high schools in New York (state)
Schools in Nassau County, New York
1955 establishments in New York (state)